Quesadilla salvadoreña is a pan dulce, similar to a pound cake, made with rice flour and queso duro blanco and topped with sesame seeds, that is popular in El Salvador. Queso duro blanco is near impossible to obtain outside of El Salvador, so the substitute for it is usually either cotija, Parmesan or feta cheese.  It is commonly served with coffee as part of breakfast or as a snack. It is traditionally baked on Sunday mornings.

As of 2021 the dish can increasingly be found in US cities such as San Antonio, New York, and Los Angeles that have large Salvadoran diaspora populations.

Culinary History 

When the Spanish conquistadors arrived at the beginning of the 16th century, a new agriculture was created in El Salvador. These new ingredients such as animals and vegetables, had been implemented into El Salvador and the European ways of cooking had interconnected with native ingredients and dishes.

There are also multiple economical and environmental factors that have influenced the cuisine of El Salvador which include the overall poverty of the country as a result of gang violence, government corruption and low paying wages. As well as the agricultural vulnerability created by the persistent volcanic eruptions and earthquakes that causes alternating floods and droughts. All of this results in the limited opportunities of food advances so they are left to rely on simple and sustainable staples as the core of their dishes.

The historical origin study of the word Quesadilla, conveys that the word derives from the Spanish word Queso, meaning cheese in Spanish. More specifically, the quesada pasiega is a type of cheese pudding came to be known around the 15th century. This pudding had been originated in the  Cantabian Region of Northern Spain and was served either hot or cold, portraying the consistency of a slightly sweet pudding. This recipe was then shared amongst other countries such as the United States, Chile, Mexico, Peru and El Salvador. Throughout it being shared, the recipe was slowly modified and shaped into what the Salvadorans enjoy, know and love. Quesadilla Salvadorena was inspired from other countries variations of the quesadilla, and slowly started to become popular in small local bakeries and villages in El Salvador.

Types of Quesadillas and the Similarities 

Some countries and regions have their own variations of the Quesadilla Salvadoreña. Each of them using similar ingredients such as yoghurt, butter or milk. Some may not include cheese entirely, but all recipes contain the ingredients that create a pound cake like texture. These additions may also include things like lemon, orange, vanilla or almond extract, or the addition of dried fruits, such as currants or dried cranberries.

Mexico 
Mexican diminutive of quesada consisting traditionally of a corn tortilla but also a flour tortilla, it is primarily filled with cheese, and sometimes meats, spices. They are cooked on a griddle or stove, and it is made with two tortillas that hold a layer of cheese between them. They have an opposite flavour profile to Salvadorian Quesadilla even though they are neighbouring countries - similarities still.

Costa Rica 
Queque seco is a soft butter cake, flavored with orange, popular in Costa Rica and also in many Latin American countries. It is a lighter and drier version than typical pound cake, and popularity in this dessert peaks during Easter week celebrations - this celebration being one of the most important and celebrated holidays in Costa Rica. It is very similar to quesadilla salvadoreña

Greece 
In Greece, an orange cake is prepared in which Greek yogurt is added to the dough. The cake is also soaked in a syrup made from orange juice. It is called the portokalopita. As it is cake made using phyllo pastry sheets and orange flavoured syrup, it is really a dense cake. Portokalopita originated as a means to not waste left over dried up phyllo flakes that remained after making traditional greek pies, like cheese pie and spinach pie.

Italy 
Schiacciata alla fiorentina is an orange-flavored cake emblematic of the Carnival and Shrove Tuesday period in Florence, Italy. It is a large, flat cake with powdered sugar - dusted cakes. The meaning for Schiacciata is 'squashed' or 'flattened' as well as ‘something sweet’ and ‘strictly seasonal’. They are traditionally served plain, sometimes filled with slightly sweetened cream. It is a favourite for a mid-morning or afternoon snack or even breakfast, similar to how quesadilla salvadoreña is enjoyed.

Poland 
Sernik is a traditional Polish cheesecake, made from fresh cheese called twarog. It is the most common dessert in Poland and was created in the 17th century. The traditional recipe is a sweet pastry crust filled with a type of farmer cheese called twaróg and then baked. Sernik is similar to a strawberry cheesecake but instead of a graham cracker crust, the base is sponge cake. It can be baked in a square or round pan—both are traditional. Twaróg is a firmer cheese and it creates a luscious and creamy filling. However, it is a difficult cheese to obtain like the quesadilla salvadoreña.

France 
Fiadone is a delicious cheesecake prepared with brocciu, a traditional Corsican cheese made from sheep’s or goat’s milk. It is the most popular Corsican dessert. As the name suggests the Fiadone resembles a flan with simple ingredients like cheese, eggs, sugar and flavourings like lemon and a splash of liqueur. However, it doesn’t have a biscuit base and is still considered a Corsican cheesecake. It originated from the Italian Fiadoni flans. It is accepted as a dessert or breakfast just like quesadilla salvadoreña.

Hunger Crisis in El Salvador 

The Quesadilla Salvadorena was an easy and sustainable dessert at the time of its origination as their sustainability of food systems had been affected after the shock of volcanic eruptions, earthquakes, floods, droughts and other natural disasters. This would potentially leave El Salvador with food shortages, thus having to make do with very little ingredients and food that they had. Foods such as cheese, milk, flour and eggs were staples in El Salvador, making it simple to come up with struggle meals that did not use too many resources. In this case, one of the struggle meals was the Quesadilla Salvadorena. Rice was ground up and used for the flour within the Quesadilla, and both milk and cheese were easily attainable. Because of these easily obtainable ingredients for the time of their struggles, they were able to create a dense and sweet dessert that would be able to make you full as well as help ration food for longer.

References

External links 
- Vera Abitol. Quesadilla Salvadorena. 2020.

- Jeremy Castillo. The Glass Files, We all make History. July 20, 2021.

- Igor. Cooking the Globe, Quesadilla salvadorena - sweet cheese bread. July 16, 2017.

- Lizet. Curious Cuisine, Salvadoran Quesadilla (Sweet Cheese Pound Cake). May 24, 2022.

- World Food Programme. El Salvador. 2023.

- Britannica, El Salvador, The Colonial Period. 2023.

Breads
Cakes
Salvadoran cuisine
Rice flour dishes
Sesame dishes
Sweet breads